This is a list of the squads picked for the 2016 Under-19 Cricket World Cup.

Group A

Bangladesh
Bangladesh's squad was announced on 23 December 2015.

Coach: Mohammad Mizanur Rahman

Namibia

Coach: Rangarirai Manyande

Scotland
Scotland's squad was announced on 22 December 2015. Scott Cameron was originally named in the squad, but was replaced by Cameron Sloman after injuring his back prior to the tournament.

Coaches: Gordon Drummond and Cedric English

 Note: bowling information on all Scottish players is not yet available.

South Africa

South Africa's squad was announced on 21 December 2015.

Coach: Lawrence Mahatlane

Group B

Afghanistan
Coach: Dawlat Ahmadzai

Canada
Coach: Errol Barrow

Pakistan

Pakistan's squad was announced on 19 December 2015.

Coach: Muhammad Masroor

Sri Lanka
Sri Lanka's squad was announced on 23 December 2015.

Coach: Roger Wijesuriya

Group C

England
England named their 15-man squad on 22 December.

Coach: Andy Hurry

Fiji
Coach: Shane Jurgensen

West Indies
West Indies named their squad on 31 December. Obed McCoy sustained an injury before the quarter finals took place and Chemar Holder was called in to replace him.

Coach: Graeme West

Zimbabwe
Coach: Stephen Mangongo

Group D

India

India's squad was announced on 22 December 2015:

Coach: Rahul Dravid

Ireland
Ireland were added to the tournament on 6 January 2016 after Australia withdrew. They announced their squad two days later:

Coach: Ryan Eagleson

Nepal
Coach: Jagat Tamatta

There were some concerns about the eligibility of Nepal's captain, Raju Rijal, with reports stating he was over 19 years of age. However, the ICC were satisfied that his date of birth was correct.

New Zealand
New Zealand's squad was announced on 24 December 2015:

Coach: Bob Carter

Notes
Australia's squad was announced on 19 December 2015. However, on 5 January 2016, Cricket Australia announced that the Australian U19 squad have pulled out of the tournament, citing security concerns. Australia's squad consisted of the following players: Wes Agar, Michael Cormack, Kyle Gardiner, Jordan Gauci, Brooke Guest, David Grant, Sam Grimwade, Sam Harper, Liam Hatcher, Clint Hinchliffe, Henry Hunt, Caleb Jewell, Jonathan Merlo, Arjun Nair, Tom O'Donnell, Jonte Pattison, Patrick Page, Jhye Richardson, Jason Sangha, Ben Taylor and Henry Thornton.

References

ICC Under-19 Cricket World Cup squads
2016 ICC Under-19 Cricket World Cup